Kim Voss (born 1952) is a professor of sociology at the University of California, Berkeley whose main field of research is social movements and the American labor movement.

Education and career
Voss received her bachelor's degree from Catawba College in Salisbury, North Carolina in 1974.

She obtained a master's of science degree in sociology from Cornell University in 1977, and a doctorate in sociology from Stanford University in 1986.

Since the fall of 1986, Voss has taught at the University of California, Berkeley.

In 1988, she was a visiting scholar at the Center for Studies of Social Change at the New School for Social Research.

Voss served as the chair of the Sociology Department at the University of California, Berkeley, from 2004-2007. She was the first female chair of the department.

Research focus
Voss' research focus is the American labor movement, the nature and culture of work, social movements, and comparative sociology.

Much of Voss' early work analyzed why American labor unions were conservative and weak vis-a-vis their European counterparts. In The Making of American Exceptionalism: The Knights of Labor and Class Formation in the Nineteenth Century, Voss argued that the formative period for the American labor movement was the 1870s and 1880s, and that the creation and collapse of the Knights of Labor was a critical factor in determining the future of the American labor movement.  Voss examined whether American exceptionalism was the cause of or an outcome of the collapse of the Knights.  She concluded the latter, and argued that strong business resistance to unions, weak government and legal protections for worker rights (two sides of the same coin) explained the subsequent politics and culture of unions in America.  Voss also argued, however, that the Knights had adopted an ideology which was not resilient in the face of organizational collapse.

More recently, Voss has explored the factors which cause the rise of transnational social movements. She is also studying the power of story-telling and narrative song in social movements.

Memberships and awards
Voss has been the recipient of a number of awards and honors.  Her article "Formal Organization and the Fate of Social Movements," which appeared in the American Sociological Review in 1990 was named Best Recent Article by the Comparative Historical Section of the American Sociological Association (ASA) in 1991.

The Political Sociology Section of the American Sociological Association gave her its Distinguished Contribution to Scholarship Award for a First Book honor in 1995 for her book, The Making of American Exceptionalism: The Knights of Labor and Class Formation in the Nineteenth Century.

The book Inequality by Design: Cracking the Bell Curve Myth, which she co-authored, won the Myers Center Award for the Study of Human Rights in North America in 1997.

Her article "Breaking the Iron Law of Oligarchy," which she co-authored Rachel Sherman and which appeared in the American Journal of Sociology in September 2000 won the Distinguished Article Award from the Labor Studies Division of the Society for the Study of Social Problems in 2001.

Voss has served in a wide variety of capacities in several professional organizations as well.  She was chair of the prize committee of the Comparative Historical Section of the ASA from 1991 to 1992 and again from 1996 to 1999; council representative for the Collective Behavior and Social Movements Section of the ASA from 1994 to 1997; chair of the Labor and Labor Movements Section of the ASA from 2002 to 2003; and secretary-treasurer of the Political Sociology Section of the ASA from 2002 to 2005.

She serves or has served on the editorial board of the Rose Monograph Series, Contexts and the American Sociological Review. She is also a reviewer form many journals, including the American Journal of Sociology, American Sociological Review, Industrial Relations, Mobilization, Perspectives on Politics, and Theory and Society.

She is a member of the American Sociological Association and the Social Science History Association.

Published works

Solely authored books
The Making of American Exceptionalism: The Knights of Labor and Class Formation in the Nineteenth Century. Ithaca, N.Y.: Cornell University Press, 1993.

Co-authored books
Fischer, Claude; Hout, Michael; Jankowski, Martin Sanchez; Lucas, Samuel R.; Swidler, Ann; and Voss, Kim. Inequality by Design: Cracking the Bell Curve Myth. Princeton, N.J.: Princeton University Press, 1996. 
Voss, Kim and Fantasia, Rick. Hard Work: Remaking the American Labor Movement. Berkeley: University of California Press, 2004.

Co-edited books
Milkman, Ruth and Kim Voss, eds. Rebuilding Labor: Organizing and Organizers in the New Union Movement. Ithaca, N.Y.: Cornell University Press, 2004.

Solely authored book chapters
"Claim-Making and the Interpretation of Defeats: The Interpretation of Losses by American and British Labor Activists, 1886-1895." In Challenging Authority: The Historical Study of Contentious Politics. Michael Hanagan, Leslie Page Moon and Wayne Te Brake, eds. Minneapolis: University of Minnesota Press, 1998. 
"The Collapse of a Social Movement: The Interplay of Mobilizing Structures, Framing, and Political Opportunities in the Knights of Labor." In Comparative Perspectives on Social Movements: Political Opportunities, Mobilizing Structures, and Cultural Framings. Doug McAdam, John McCarthy, and Mayer Zald, eds. New York: Cambridge University Press, 1996. 
"Sombart, the Knights of Labor, and Class Formation in America." In Werner Sombart and 'American Exceptionalism. Mark R. Thompson, ed. Berlin: Lit Verlag, 2004.

Co-authored book chapters
Carter, Bob; Fairbrother, Peter; Voss, Kim; and Sherman, Rachel. "Made in the USA: The TUC, the Organising Model and the Limits of Transferability." In Research in the Sociology of Work.  Vol. 11: Labor Revitalization: Global Perspectives and New Initiatives. Amsterdam: JAI Press, 2003.
Ganz, Marshall; Voss, Kim; Sharpe, Teresa; Somers, Carl and Strauss, George. "Against the Tide: Projects and Pathways of the New Generation of Union Leaders, 1984 2001." In Rebuilding Labor: Organizing and Organizers in the New Union Movement. Ruth Milkman and Kim Voss, eds. Ithaca, N.Y.: Cornell University Press, 2004. 
Voss, Kim and Sherman, Rachel. "Organize or Die: Labor’s New Tactics and Immigrant Workers." In Organizing Immigrants: The Challenge for Unions in Contemporary California. Ruth Milkman, ed. Ithaca, N.Y.: Cornell University Press, 2000. 
Voss, Kim and Sherman, Rachel. "You Can't Just Do it Automatically: The Transition to Social Movement Unionism in the United States." In Trade Unions in Renewal: A Comparative Study. Peter Fairbrother and Charlotte A.B. Yates, eds. London: Continuum, 2003.

Solely authored articles
"Disposition Is Not Action: The Rise and Demise of the Knights of Labor." Studies in American Political Development. 6 (Fall 1992).
"Labor Organization and Class Alliance: Industries, Communities, and the Knights of Labor." Theory and Society. 17 (1988).

Co-authored articles
Voss, Kim and Conell, Carol. "Formal Organization and the Fate of Social Movements." American Sociological Review. 55 (1990).
Voss, Kim and Fantasia, Rick. "The Future of American Labor: Reinventing Unions." Contexts. 3 (Spring 2004).
Voss, Kim and Sherman, Rachel. "Breaking the Iron Law of Oligarchy: Tactical Innovation and the Revitalization of the American Labor Movement." American Journal of Sociology. 106 (September 2000).

References
Kim Voss, professor and chair, Dept. of Sociology, UC-Berkeley
Kim Voss C.V.

External links
Dept. of Sociology, University of California, Berkeley

Writers from Berkeley, California
University of California, Berkeley faculty
Cornell University alumni
Stanford University alumni
Labor historians
21st-century American historians
Historians of the United States
American sociologists
American women sociologists
1952 births
Living people
Catawba College alumni
American women historians
21st-century American women writers
Historians from California